This is the list of  located in Estonia (mainly in Tallinn). The list is incomplete.

See also
 List of palaces and manor houses in Estonia

References 

Summer manors
 
Summer manors